Hur or HUR may refer to:

People
 Hur (Korean name), also spelled Heo
 Hur (Bible), a number of biblical figures 
 Hur-ul-Nisa Begum, first of the fourteen children of Mumtaz Mahal

Places
 Hur, Iran (disambiguation), a number of places 
 Hur, West Virginia, U.S.

Other uses
 Ḥūr or Houri, beings in Islamic mythology
 Hurs, a Muslim Sufi community in Sindh, Pakistan
 Greater Copenhagen Authority (HUR), a former Danish regional development organisation
 Halkomelem language, ISO 639-3 language code hur
 Handball Union of Russia (HUR)
 ELAV-like protein 1, or HuR, a human gene
HUR MOA, the Chief Directorate of Intelligence of the Ministry of Defence of Ukraine

See also

Ahrar (disambiguation) (for al hurr)
Ben-Hur (disambiguation)
Her (disambiguation)
Hura (disambiguation)
Hurra (disambiguation)
Hurriya (disambiguation)